Wendy Xu (born 1987) is a Chinese American Poet.

Xu was born in Shandong China in 1987 but was raised in the United States in Iowa and New York. She earned her BA at the University of Iowa and finished her graduate studies at the University of Massachusetts Amherst. Xu has published several collections including You Are Not Dead (2013), Phrasis (2017), The Hero Poems (2011), and I Was Not Even Born (2013, coauthored with Nick Sturm). She currently lives and teaches in Brooklyn, New York where she also works as the co-editor and publisher of iO: A Journal of New American Poetry / iO Books as well as a poet and poetry editor for Hyperallergic.

Poetry

Structure and syntax 
Xu's poems are often written as single stanza works that lack rhyme or meter. She frequently uses enjambment to create sharp breaks between lines as well as to add to the aesthetic of her poetry. Xu often writes using idiosyncratic language and imagery to mirror the effect of enjambment in her expression of thought. Xu frequently uses concrete images to create the abstract idea that she is attempting to communicate to the audience. In a 2014 review of Xu's work You Are Not Dead, Raena Shirali observed that in Xu's poetry "The concrete world is in the spotlight while the personal and confessional take place off stage—far away enough that we can see hints of it, but not so close that we comprehend the details we’re presented with in a narrative sense”. While Xu often switches images very quickly throughout her poems her vivid description of each subject gives her work "rhetorically complex but unbelievably casual" tone. Her poems are also described as lyrical because of her in-depth descriptions paired with her complex language.

Major themes 
Xu's works have been described as "meditative poems that embrace the ephemeral nature of intimacy." As well as writing with a distinctive tone and technique Xu has several prominent themes that repeat throughout her works. Xu's most notable theme in her poetry is identity. This is regularly paired with the theme of intimacy in her works as she reflects upon her own identity in an intimate nature. Another prominent theme in Xu's work is the briefness of many experiences. This theme is reflected and supported by the syntax of her poetry.

Works

Books 

Phrasis (Fence, 2017)
You Are Not Dead (Cleveland State University Poetry Center, 2013)

Chapbooks 

Naturalism (Brooklyn Arts Press, 2015)
Phrasis (Black Cake Records, 2014)
The Hero Poems (H_NGM_N, 2011)

Awards and appearances 
Wendy Xu was awarded the Patricia Goedicke Prize in Poetry in 2011, Ottoline Prize and the Ruth Lilly Fellowship in 2014. 
She has also appeared in:
A Public Space
Academy of American Poets 
Asian American Writers Workshop
Black Warrior Review
Brooklyn Magazine
Conduit
Everyday Genius
Guernica
Gulf Coast
Hyperallergic
Narrative Magazine
PEN Poetry Series
Poetry 
Poetry Project 
Versa Daily
The Volta

References 

1987 births
Living people
American women poets
21st-century American poets
21st-century American women writers
Poets from Shandong
Chinese emigrants to the United States
American poets
American writers of Chinese descent
University of Iowa alumni
University of Massachusetts Amherst alumni